Javier Miralpeix (born 14 August 1966) is a Spanish former freestyle swimmer who competed in the 1984 Summer Olympics.

References

1966 births
Living people
Spanish male freestyle swimmers
Olympic swimmers of Spain
Swimmers at the 1984 Summer Olympics